DTWNS (vocalized by historians as Datawnas) was a king of Aksum (c. 260). He is mentioned with his son ZQRNS (vocalized as "Zaqarnas") in an inscription from al-Mis`al in Yemen which Yasir Yuhan'im erected after defeating father and son.

Notes 

Kings of Axum
3rd-century monarchs in Africa
Year of birth uncertain
Year of death uncertain